A strikebreaker (sometimes called a scab, blackleg, or knobstick) is a person who works despite a strike. Strikebreakers are usually individuals who were not employed by the company before the trade union dispute but hired after or during the strike to keep the organization running.  Strikebreakers may also refer to workers (union members or not) who cross picket lines to work.

The use of strikebreakers is a worldwide phenomenon; many countries have passed laws outlawing their use to give more power to unionized workers. , strikebreakers were used far more frequently in the United States than in other industrialized countries.

International law

The right to strike is well-established in international law. In particular, the 1966 International Covenant on Economic, Social and Cultural Rights establishes:  "The right to strike, provided that it is exercised in conformity with the laws of the particular country." The International Labour Organization (ILO) Committee on Freedom of Association and other ILO bodies have interpreted all core ILO conventions as protecting the right to strike as an essential element of the freedom of association as well as the freedom for workers to organize and established principles on the right to strike through rulings. For example, the ILO has ruled that "the right to strike is an intrinsic corollary of the right of association protected by Convention No. 87."

The European Social Charter of 1961 was the first international agreement to expressly protect the right to strike.  Similar to international law, the European Union's Community Charter of the Fundamental Social Rights of Workers permits EU member states to regulate the right to strike. 

Striker replacement (hiring workers to replace striking workers during the course of a strike) is not banned or restricted by current international law. However, the ILO has concluded striker replacement, while not in contravention of ILO agreements, carries with it significant risks for abuse and places trade union freedoms "in grave jeopardy." Regarding permanent replacement rather than just replacement for the duration of the strike, the ILO has held that "this basic right [to strike] is not really guaranteed when a worker who exercises it legally runs the risk of seeing his or her job taken up permanently by another worker."

National laws

Asia
 Japanese labor law significantly restricts the ability of both an employer and a union to engage in labor disputes. The  law highly regulates labor relations to ensure labor peace and channel conflict into collective bargaining, mediation and arbitration. It bans the use of strikebreakers.
 South Korea bans the use of strikebreakers, although the practice remains common.

Europe
In most European countries, strikebreakers are rarely used. Consequently, they are rarely if ever mentioned in most European national labor laws. As mentioned above, it is left to the European Union member states to determine their own policies.
 Germany has employment law that protects worker rights, but trade unions and the right to strike are not regulated by statute. The Bundesarbeitsgericht (the Federal Labor Court of Germany) and the Bundesverfassungsgericht (the Federal Constitutional Court of Germany) have, however, issued a large number of rulings which essentially regulate trade union activities such as strikes. Work councils, for example, may not strike at all, but trade unions retain an almost unlimited ability to strike. The widespread use of work councils, however, channels most labor disputes and reduces the likelihood of strikes. Efforts to enact a comprehensive federal labor relations law that regulates strikes, lockouts and the use of strikebreakers failed.
 United Kingdom laws permit strikebreaking, and courts have significantly restricted the right of unions to punish members who act as strikebreakers.

North America
 Canada has federal industrial relations laws that strongly regulate the use of strikebreakers. Although many Canadian labor unions today advocate for even stronger regulations, scholars point out that Canadian labor law has far greater protections for union members and the right to strike than American labor law, which has significantly influenced the development of labor relations in Canada. In Quebec, the use of strikebreakers is illegal, but companies may try to remain open with only managerial personnel.
 Mexico has a federal labor law that requires companies to cease operations during a legal strike, effectively preventing the use of strikebreakers.
 The U.S. Supreme Court held in NLRB v. Mackay Radio & Telegraph Co., 304 U.S. 333 (1938) that an employer may not discriminate on the basis of union activity in reinstating employees at the end of a strike. The ruling effectively encourages employers to hire strikebreakers so that the union loses majority support in the workplace when the strike ends. The Mackay Court also held that employers enjoy the unrestricted right to permanently replace strikers with strikebreakers.

Synonyms
Strikebreaking is also known as black-legging or blacklegging. American lexicographer Stephanie Smith suggests that the word has to do with bootblacking or shoe polish, for an early occurrence of the word was in conjunction with an 1803 American bootmaker's strike. But British industrial relations expert J.G. Riddall notes that it may have a racist connotation, as it was used in this way in 1859 in the United Kingdom: "If you dare work we shall consider you as blacks..." Lexicographer Geoffrey Hughes, however, notes that blackleg and scab are both references to disease, as in the blackleg infectious bacterial disease of sheep and cattle caused by Clostridium chauvoei. He dates the first use of the term blackleg in reference to strikebreaking to the United Kingdom in 1859. The use of the term blackleg for a strikebreaker was, however, previously recorded in 1832 during the trial of special constable George Weddell for killing and slaying Cuthbert Skipsey, a striking pitman, near Chirton, Newcastle-upon-Tyne. Hughes observes that the term was once generally used to indicate a scoundrel, a villain, or a disreputable person.  However, the Northumbrian folk song Blackleg Miner is believed to originate from the 1844 strike, which would predate Hughes's reference.  David John Douglass claims that the term blackleg  has its origins in coal mining, as strikebreakers would often neglect to wash their legs, which would give away that they had been working whilst others had been on strike.

Hughes notes that the use of the term scab can be traced back to the Elizabethan era in England, and is much more clearly rooted in the concept of disease (e.g., a diseased person) and a sickened appearance.  A traditional English proverb, which advises against gossip, is "He that is a blab is a scab".

John McIlroy has suggested that there is a distinction between a blackleg and a scab.  He defines a scab as an outsider who is recruited to replace a striking worker, whereas a blackleg is one already employed who goes against a democratic decision of their colleagues to strike, and instead continues to work.  The fact that McIlroy specified that this should be a "democratic" decision has led the historian David Amos to question whether the Nottinghamshire miners in 1984–85 were true blacklegs, given the lack of a democratic vote on the strike.

Strikebreakers are also known as knobsticks. The term appears derived from the word knob, in the sense of something that sticks out, and from the card-playing term nob, as someone who cheats.

See also
 Molly Maguires
 "The Scab" by Jack London (attributed)
 "Blackleg Miner" (song)
 Mohawk Valley formula

Notes

References and further reading
 Committee on Freedom of Association.  International Labour Organization. Digest of Decisions of the Committee on Freedom of Association. 5th (revised) ed.  Geneva: International Labour Organization, 2006.
 Dau-Schmidt, Kenneth Glenn. "Labor Law and Industrial Peace: A Comparative Analysis of the United States, the United Kingdom, Germany, and Japan Under the Bargaining Model." Tulane Journal of International & Comparative Law. 2000.
 Ewing, Keith. "Laws Against Strikes Revisited." In Future of Labour Law. Catharine Barnard, Gillian S. Morris, and Simon Deakin, eds. Oxford: Hart Publishing, 2004. 
 Hughes, Geoffrey. An Encyclopedia of Swearing: The Social History of Oaths, Profanity, Foul Language, and Ethnic Slurs in the English-Speaking World. Armonk, N.Y.: M.E. Sharpe, 2006.
 International Labour Organization. Freedom of Association and Collective Bargaining: General Survey of the Reports on the Freedom of Association and the Right to Organise Convention (No. 87), 1948, and the Right to Organise and Collective Bargaining Convention (no. 98), 1949. Geneva: International Labour Organization, 1994.
 Körner, Marita. "German Labor Law in Transition." German Law Journal. 6:4 (April 2005).
 Logan, John. "How 'Anti-Union' Laws Saved Canadian Labour: Certification and Striker Replacements in Post-War Industrial Relations." Relations Industrielles/Industrial Relations. 57:1 (January 2002).
 Parry, Richard Lloyd. "Labour Law Draws Roar of Rage From Asian Tiger." The Independent. January 18, 1997.
 Riddall, J.G. The Law of Industrial Relations. London: Butterworths, 1982.
 
 Silver, Beverly J. Forces of Labor: Workers' Movements and Globalization Since 1870. New York: Cambridge University Press, 2003. 
 Smith, Stephanie. Household Words: Bloomers, Sucker, Bombshell, Scab, Nigger, Cyber. Minneapolis: University of Minnesota Press, 2006. 
 Sugeno, Kazuo and Kanowitz, Leo. Japanese Employment and Labor Law. Durham, N.C.: Carolina Academic Press, 2002. 
 Westfall, David and Thusing, Gregor. "Strikes and Lockouts in Germany and Under Federal Legislation in the United States: A Comparative Analysis." Boston College International & Comparative Law Review. 22 (1999).

United States
 Arnesen, Eric. "Specter of the Black Strikebreaker: Race, Employment, and Labor Activism in the Industrial Era." Labor History 44.3 (2003): 319-335 online.
 Erlich, Richard L. "Immigrant strikebreaking activity: A sampling of opinion expressed in the National Labor Tribune, 1878-1885." Labor History (1974) 15: 529-42.
 Getman, Julius G. and Kohler, Thomas C. "The Story of NLRB v. Mackay Radio & Telegraph Co.: The High Cost of Solidarity." In Labor Law Stories. Laura J. Cooper and Catherine L. Fisk, eds. New York: Foundation Press, 2005. 
 Human Rights Watch. Unfair Advantage: Workers' Freedom of Association in the United States Under International Human Rights Standards. Washington, D.C.: Human Rights Watch, 2000. 
 Isaac, Larry W., Rachel G. McKane, and Anna W. Jacobs. "Pitting the Working Class against Itself: Solidarity, Strikebreaking, and Strike Outcomes in the Early US Labor Movement." Social Science History 46.2 (2022): 315-348. online
 Keiser, John H. "Black Strikebreakers and Racism in Illinois, 1865-1900." Journal of Illinois State Historical Society (1972) 65: 313-26.
 Noon, Mark. " 'It ain't your color, it's your scabbing': literary depictions of African American strikebreakers." African American Review 38.3 (2004): 429-439.
 Norwood, Stephen H. Strikebreaking & intimidation: mercenaries and masculinity in twentieth-century America Chapel Hill, N.C.: University of North Carolina Press, 2002.  online review
 Rosenbloom, Joshua L. “Strikebreaking and the labor market in the United States, 1881–1894.” Journal of Economic History (1998) 58 (1): 183–205.
 Smith, Robert Michael. From Blackjacks to Briefcases: A History of Commercialized Strikebreaking and Unionbusting in the United States. Athens, Ohio: Ohio University Press, 2003. 
 Tuttle, William J., Jr. "Some strikebreakers' observations of industrial warfare." Labor History (1966) 7: I93-96.
 Tuttle, William J., Jr. "Labor conflict and racial violence: The black worker in Chicago, 1894-1919." Labor History (1969) 10: 408-32.
 Whatley, Warren C. "African-American Strikebreaking from the Civil War to the New Deal." Social Science History 17.4 (1993): 525-558. online

Labor disputes